Chiao En-chun (born 7 November 1967), also known as Vincent Chiao, is a Taiwanese actor and Mandopop singer. He is best known for portraying heroes in costume television dramas.

Filmography

Films

Television series

Discography

Albums / EPs

Other songs
"Duoshao Gushi Neng Wanmei" (多少故事能完美; "How Many Stories Are Required for Perfection") — insert song for the 2003 TV series Wolf Hero
"Wo de Tianxia" (我的天下; "My World" — duet with Liu Xiaoxue) — theme song for the 2012 TV series Beauty in the South

References
YesAsia: Vincent Chiao (China Version)
CCTV Chinese World feature (English caption)

External links
 Vincentchiaofans.com/bbs (Vincent Chiao's fan club)
 Jiaoenjun.com (Vincent Chiao a.k.a. Jiao Enjun's Hong Kong fan club)

Taiwanese male film actors
1967 births
Living people
Taiwanese male television actors
20th-century Taiwanese male actors
21st-century Taiwanese male actors
People from Chiayi
Taiwanese Mandopop singers
Taiwanese male singers